Jennie de la Montagnie Lozier (1841 – August 6, 1915) was an American physician. At the age of nineteen, she began to teach, becoming an instructor in languages and literature in Hillsdale College. Returning to New York City in 1872, she married Abraham Witton Lozier, Jr., the son of Clemence Sophia Harned Lozier, who was the founder and dean of the New York Medical College and Hospital for Women. Here, she studied medicine and after receiving her medical degree, became a professor of physiology. She served on the hospital staff for twelve years and retired from professional work in 1890 to devote herself to her domestic, social, and educational interests. She was a delegate to the International Homoeopathic Congress in Paris in 1889 and was president of Sorosis Club from 1891–94.

Early life and education
Jeanne "Jennie" de la Montagnie was born in New York in 1841- or ca. 1850 - and was a lifelong resident of that city. Her father was William de la Montagnie, Jr.  Her ancestors were Dutch and French Huguenots who settled there as early as 1633. Born and raised in the old seventh ward of New York, she received an extensive, liberal education, which included languages and science. In her early adulthood, she matriculated at Rutgers Female Institute (later, Rutgers Female College), of which she became a trustee and which conferred upon her its Doctor of Science degree in 1891.

Career

After her graduation, she traveled in the West Indies. When she was nineteen years old, she began to teach and became a professor teaching language and literature courses at Hillsdale College in Hillsdale, Michigan. Thereafter, she was elected vice-principal of its women's department. Returning to New York in 1872, she married the only son of her lifelong friend Clemence S. Lozier, A.W. Lozier. Consequently, the young college professor became the head of a family simultaneously since her new husband had been a widower and had two children by his first wife. 

She became interested in medicine through her mother-in-law, Clemence S. Lozier, the founder and twenty-five-year dean of the New York Medical College and Hospital for Women. The younger Mrs. Lozier soon  graduated with an M.D. after giving birth to her first and only child. Then, she became a professor of physiology at her alma mater and served on the hospital’s staff. After twelve years of service, she retired from the profession and devoted herself to domestic, social and educational interests.

Just before her retirement, she was invited by the Sorosis Club to give a lecture on "Physical Culture." Sorosis made her one of its members as a result of her work and the forceful speaker became prominent in its councils. In Sorosis, she served as chairman of the committee on science, as chairman of the committee on philanthropy, and as a corresponding secretary. She was even  elected the club’s president in 1891 and 1892. In 1892, she represented them as a delegate to the biennial council of the Federation of Women's Clubs, held in Chicago, May 11–13. There, she read a paper on the "Educational Influence of Women's Clubs."

She also engaged in numerous other activities. In 1889, the New York Medical College and Hospital for Women sent her to Paris as a delegate to the International Homeopathic Congress. She presented a paper in French on the medical education of women in the United States, which was printed in full in the subsequent congressional transactions. She was also the president of two other clubs. The first of these two was The Emerson, a club of men and women belonging to R. Heber Newton's church, of which she was a member. The other club, the Avon, was a fortnightly drawing-room club. Moreover, she was a member of the science committee of the Association for the Advancement of Women and of the Patria Club. She read papers before various literary and reform associations in and near New York City.

In the meantime, her family, consisting of her husband, two sons, and one daughter, spent their summers on Great South Bay, Long Island, in a villa named "Windhurst." Her husband, A.W. Lozier, would later give up his practice to engage in the real-estate and building business in New York. Their winter home, on 78th Street, was an ideal one in terms of its appointments and associations.

She also studied literature and art. Eventually, her liberal education and compassion for her fellow women led her to advocate for more liberal education for women. As she had done, she wanted other women to be able to study art, music, chemistry, social economics, psychology, pedagogy, and physiology as they so desired. She influenced many people as a club-woman and as the president of Sorosis, occupying a commanding position in the fields of social, literary, and general cultures that the clubs opened to women.

Death
Jennie de la Montagnie Lozier died at her summer home in New Brighton, Staten Island, on August 6, 1915, aged 74 years.

References

Attribution

External links

1841 births
1915 deaths
19th-century American women physicians
19th-century American physicians
Physicians from New York City
New York Medical College alumni
New York Medical College faculty
American women academics

Wikipedia articles incorporating text from A Woman of the Century